Thixendale is a village and civil parish in the Ryedale district of North Yorkshire, England. Historically part of the East Riding of Yorkshire, it is located in the Yorkshire Wolds about 20 miles east of York.

The place-name Thixendale is first attested in the Domesday Book of 1086, where it appears as Sixtendale and Xistendale. The name means 'Sigstein's dale or valley'. The name Sigstein is also the source for the name of Sysonby in Leicestershire.

In 2016 North Yorkshire County Council estimated the population of the parish to be 200.

The only pub, the Cross Keys, is a regular winner of local CAMRA awards.

The Yorkshire Wolds Way National Trail, a long distance footpath passes to the east end of the village.

The church of St Mary, Thixendale is one of a group of village buildings constructed to designs by George Edmund Street in 1868–1870. It was designated in 1966 by English Heritage as a Grade II* listed building. It is on the Sykes Churches Trail devised by the East Yorkshire Historic Churches Group.

For many years until the late 1990s, television signals were blocked by the surrounding hills until a small transmitter was built, providing the village with terrestrial television for the first time. The transmitter ceased operation in the early 2000s, with villagers now relying on satellite TV and, since 2017, fast broadband.

References

External links

 The Village of Thixendale information about the village, where to stay, interesting walks in the area, pictures and other local information,
 A requiem to Thixendale's Youth Hostel

Villages in North Yorkshire
Civil parishes in North Yorkshire